James McInerney (15 December 1844 – 8 July 1912) was an Australian politician.

He was born at Portland Head, near Windsor, to James McInerney and Honora Ryan. He grew up in Campbelltown and in the 1860s went to Narrandera and then Gundagai, working as a carrier. He eventually acquired property around Gundagai and was also involved in mining. He married Julia McLean, with whom he had eight children. He was a member of the Farmers and Settlers Association from 1899, serving as vice-president from 1899 to 1902 and as president from 1902 to 1905. In 1906 he resigned from the Association to join the Labor Party. From 1906 to 1911 he was President of Adjungbilly Shire. In 1912 McInerney was appointed to the New South Wales Legislative Council, but he died at Gundagai before taking his seat.

References

1844 births
1912 deaths
Members of the New South Wales Legislative Council